Carlos Manuel Costa Fernandes Fonseca (born 23 August 1987) is a Portuguese professional footballer who plays as a winger.

Club career
Born in Galegos (São Martinho), Barcelos, Fonseca played in every level of Portuguese football with the exception of the fourth division. He started with Santa Maria F.C. in the regional leagues, then moved straight to the third tier with F.C. Tirsense.

Fonseca signed with Segunda Liga club C.D. Feirense in the summer of 2010, achieving immediate promotion and scoring one goal from 27 appearances in the process. He made his debut in the Primeira Liga on 14 August 2011, starting and being sent off at the hour-mark of a 0–0 home draw against C.D. Nacional.

On 15 July 2013, Fonseca joined Bulgarian side PSFC Chernomorets Burgas after a successful one-week trial. In January 2016, he moved from PFC Slavia Sofia to Kazakhstan Premier League's FC Irtysh Pavlodar on a two-year contract after a six-month loan the previous season.

On 30 December 2018, Fonseca signed a new one-year deal with Irtysh. On 21 November of the following year, he agreed to a new extension.

Fonseca joined FC Tobol of the same country and league on 8 July 2020. On 2 July 2021, he left after his contract expired.

Career statistics

Club

References

External links

1987 births
Living people
People from Barcelos, Portugal
Sportspeople from Braga District
Portuguese footballers
Association football wingers
Primeira Liga players
Liga Portugal 2 players
Segunda Divisão players
Santa Maria F.C. players
F.C. Tirsense players
C.D. Feirense players
First Professional Football League (Bulgaria) players
PFC Chernomorets Burgas players
PFC Slavia Sofia players
Kazakhstan Premier League players
FC Irtysh Pavlodar players
FC Tobol players
FC Kyzylzhar players
Portuguese expatriate footballers
Expatriate footballers in Bulgaria
Expatriate footballers in Kazakhstan
Portuguese expatriate sportspeople in Bulgaria
Portuguese expatriate sportspeople in Kazakhstan